The Blue Angels are a flight demonstration squadron of the United States Navy. Formed in 1946, the unit is the second oldest formal aerobatic team in the world, after the French  formed in 1931. The team, composed of six Navy and one Marine Corps demonstration pilot, fly Boeing F/A-18 Super Hornets.

The Blue Angels typically perform aerial displays in at least 60 shows annually at 30 locations throughout the United States and two shows at one location in Canada. The "Blues" still employ many of the same practices and techniques used in the inaugural 1946 season. An estimated 11 million spectators view the squadron during air shows from March through November each year. Members of the Blue Angels team also visit more than 50,000 people in schools, hospitals, and community functions at air show cities. Since 1946, the Blue Angels have flown for more than 505 million spectators.

As of November 2011, the Blue Angels received $37 million annually from the annual Department of Defense budget.

Mission
The mission of the United States Navy Flight Demonstration Squadron is to showcase the pride and professionalism of the United States Navy and Marine Corps by inspiring a culture of excellence and service to the country through flight demonstrations and community outreach.

Air shows
The "Blues" perform at both military and non-military airfields, and often at major U.S. cities and capitals; also locations in Canada are often included in the air show schedule.

During their aerobatic demonstration, the six-member team flies F/A-18E Super Hornets, split into the diamond formation (Blue Angels 1through 4) and the Lead and Opposing Solos (Blue Angels 5and 6). Most of the show alternates between maneuvers performed by the Diamond Formation and those performed by the Solos. The Diamond, in tight formation and usually at lower speeds (400 mph), performs maneuvers such as formation loops, rolls, and transitions from one formation to another. The Solos showcase the high performance capabilities of their individual aircraft through the execution of high-speed passes, slow passes, fast rolls, slow rolls, and very tight turns. The highest speed flown during an air show is 700 mph (just under Mach 1) and the lowest speed, is 126 mph (110 knots) during Section High Alpha with the new Super Hornet (about 115 knots with the old "Legacy" Hornet). Some of the maneuvers include both solo aircraft performing at once, such as opposing passes (toward each other in what appears to be a collision course) and mirror formations (back-to-back, belly-to-belly, or wingtip-to-wingtip, with one jet flying inverted). The Solos join the Diamond Formation near the end of the show for a number of maneuvers in the Delta Formation.

The parameters of each show must be tailored in accordance with local weather conditions at showtime: in clear weather the high show is performed; in overcast conditions a low show is performed, and in limited visibility (weather permitting) the flat show is presented. The high show requires at least an  ceiling and visibility of at least  from the show's center point. The minimum ceilings allowed for low and flat shows are 4,500 feet, and 1,500 feet respectively.

Aircraft

The team flew the McDonnell Douglas F/A-18 Hornet for 34 years from 1986 through 2020. The team currently flies the Boeing F/A-18 Super Hornet. 

In August 2018, Boeing was awarded a contract to convert nine single-seat F/A-18E Super Hornets and two F/A-18F two-seaters for Blue Angels use. Modifications to each F/A-18E/F include removal of the weapons and replacement with a tank that contains smoke-oil used in demonstrations and outfitting the control stick with a spring system for more precise aircraft control input. Each modified F/A-18 remains in the fleet and can be returned to combat duty aboard an aircraft carrier within 72 hours. As converted aircraft were delivered, they were used for testing maneuvers starting in mid 2020. The team's Super Hornets became operational by the beginning of 2021, their 75th anniversary year.

The show's narrator flies Blue Angels No. 7, a two-seat F/A-18F Hornet, to show sites. The Blues use these jets for backups, and to give demonstration rides to VIP (civilians).  Usually, two back seats rides are available at each air show; one goes to a member of the press, and the other to the "Key Influencer".  The No. 4 slot pilot often flies the No. 7 aircraft in Friday's "practice" so that pilots from the fleet and future team members can experience the show.

The Blue Angels use a United States Marine Corps Lockheed C-130J Super Hercules, nicknamed "Fat Albert", for their logistics, carrying spare parts, equipment, and to carry support personnel between shows.

Team members
, there have been 272 demonstration pilots in the Blue Angels since their inception.

All team members, both officer and enlisted, pilots and staff officers, come from the ranks of regular Navy and United States Marine Corps units. The demonstration pilots and narrator are made up of Navy and USMC Naval Aviators. Pilots serve two to three years, and position assignments are made according to team needs, pilot experience levels, and career considerations for members. Other officers in the squadron include a naval flight officer who serves as the events coordinator, three USMC C-130 pilots, an executive officer, a maintenance officer, a supply officer, a public affairs officer, an administrative officer, and a flight surgeon. Enlisted members range from E-4 to E-9 and perform all maintenance, administrative, and support functions. They serve three to four years in the squadron. After serving with the squadron, members return to fleet assignments.

The officer selection process requires pilots and support officers (flight surgeon, events coordinator, maintenance officer, supply officer, and public affairs officer) wishing to become Blue Angels to apply formally via their chain-of-command, with a personal statement, letters of recommendation, and flight records. Navy and Marine Corps F/A-18 demonstration pilots and naval flight officers are required to have a minimum of 1,250 tactical jet hours and be carrier-qualified. Marine Corps C-130 demonstration pilots are required to have 1,200 flight hours and be an aircraft commander.

Applicants "rush" the team at one or more airshows, paid out of their own finances, and sit in on team briefs, post-show activities, and social events. It is critical that new officers fit the existing culture and team dynamics. The application and evaluation process runs from March through early July, culminating with extensive finalist interviews and team deliberations. Team members vote in secret on the next year's officers. Selections must be unanimous. There have been female and minority staff officers as Blue Angel members, including minority Blue Angel pilot Lt. Andre Webb on the 2018 team. Flight surgeons serve a two-year term. The flight surgeon provides team medical services, evaluates demonstration maneuvers from the ground, and participates in each post-flight debrief. The first female Blue Angel flight surgeon was Lt. Tamara Schnurr, who was a member of the 2001 team.

The Flight Leader (No. 1) is the Commanding Officer and is always a Navy commander, who may be promoted to captain mid-tour if approved for captain by the selection board. Pilots of numbers 2–7 are Navy lieutenant commanders or lieutenants, or Marine Corps majors or captains. The No.7 pilot narrates for a year, and then typically flies Opposing and then Lead Solo the following two years, respectively. The No.3 pilot moves to the No.4 (slot) position for their second year. Blue Angel No.4 serves as the demonstration safety officer, due largely to the perspective they are afforded from the slot position within the formation, as well as their status as a second-year demonstration pilot. The first woman named to the Blue Angels as F/A-18 demonstration pilot was Lt. Amanda Lee, who is a member of the 2023 team.

Flight Leader/Commanding Officer
Commander Alexander P. Armatas is a native of Skaneateles, New York. He graduated from the United States Naval Academy in 2002 with a Bachelor of Science in aerospace engineering. Alexander joined the Blue Angels in August 2022. He has accumulated more than 4,100 flight hours and 911 carrier-arrested landings. His decorations include the Meritorious Service Medal, four Strike/Flight Air Medals, five Navy and Marine Corps Commendation Medals, one Navy and Marine Corps Achievement Medal, and various personal, unit and service awards.

Training and weekly routine
Annual winter training takes place at NAF El Centro, California, where new and returning pilots hone skills learned in the fleet. During winter training, the pilots fly two practice sessions per day, six days a week, to fly the 120 training missions needed to perform the demonstration safely. The separation between the formation of aircraft and their maneuver altitude is gradually reduced over the course of about two months in January and February. The team then returns to their home base in Pensacola, Florida, in March, and continues to practice throughout the show season. A typical week during the season has practices at NAS Pensacola on Tuesday and Wednesday mornings. The team then flies to its show venue for the upcoming weekend on Thursday, conducting "circle and arrival" orientation maneuvers upon arrival. The team flies a "practice" airshow at the show site on Friday. This show is attended by invited guests but is often open to the general public. The main airshows are conducted on Saturdays and Sundays, with the team returning home to NAS Pensacola on Sunday evenings after the show. Monday is an off day for the Blues' demonstration pilots and road crew. Extensive aircraft maintenance is performed on Sunday evening and Monday by maintenance team members.

Pilots maneuver the flight stick with their right hand and operate the throttle with their left. They do not wear G-suits because the air bladders inside repeatedly deflate and inflate, interfering with that stability. To prevent blood from pooling in their legs, Blue Angel pilots have developed a method for tensing their muscles to prevent blood from pooling in their lower extremities, possibly rendering them unconscious.

History

Overview

The Blue Angels were originally formed in April 1946 as the Navy Flight Exhibition Team. They changed their name to the Blue Angels after seeing an advertisement for the New York nightclub The Blue Angel, also known as The Blue Angel Supper Club, in the New Yorker Magazine. The team was first introduced as the Blue Angels during an air show in July 1946.

The first Blue Angels demonstration aircraft wore navy blue (nearly black) with gold lettering. The current shades of blue and yellow were adopted when the first demonstration aircraft were transitioned from the Grumman F6F-5 Hellcat to the Grumman F8F-1 Bearcat in August 1946; the aircraft wore an all-yellow scheme with blue markings during the 1949 show season.

The original Blue Angels insignia or crest was designed in 1949, by Lt. Commander Raleigh "Dusty" Rhodes, their third Flight Leader and first jet fighter leader. The aircraft silhouettes change as the team changes aircraft.

The Blue Angels transitioned from propeller-driven aircraft to blue and gold jet aircraft (Grumman F9F-2B Panther) in August 1949.

The Blue Angels demonstration teams began wearing leather jackets and special colored flight suits with the Blue Angels insignia, in 1952. In 1953, they began wearing gold colored flight suits for the first show of the season and or to commemorate milestones for the flight demonstration squadron.

The Navy Flight Exhibition Team was reorganized and commissioned the United States Navy Flight Demonstration Squadron on 10 December 1973.

1946–1949

The Blue Angels were established as a Navy flight exhibition team on 24 April 1946 by order of Chief of Naval Operations Admiral Chester Nimitz to generate greater public support of naval aviation. To boost Navy morale, demonstrate naval air power, and maintain public interest in naval aviation, an underlying mission was to help the Navy generate public and political support for a larger allocation of the shrinking defense budget. Rear Admiral Ralph Davison personally selected Lieutenant Commander Roy Marlin "Butch" Voris, a World War II fighter ace, to assemble and train a flight demonstration team, naming him Officer-in-Charge and Flight Leader. Voris selected three fellow instructors to join him (Lt. Maurice "Wick" Wickendoll, Lt. Mel Cassidy, and Lt. Cmdr. Lloyd Barnard, veterans of the War in the Pacific), and they spent countless hours developing the show. The group perfected its initial maneuvers in secret over the Florida Everglades so that, in Voris' words, "if anything happened, just the alligators would know". The first four pilots and those after them, were and are some of the best and most experienced aviators in the Navy.

The team's first demonstration with Grumman F6F-5 Hellcat aircraft took place before Navy officials on 10 May 1946 and was met with enthusiastic approval. The Blue Angels performed their first public flight demonstration from their first training base and team headquarters at Naval Air Station (NAS) Jacksonville, Florida, on 15 and 16 June 1946, with three F6F-5 Hellcats (a fourth F6F-5 was held in reserve). On 15 June, Voris led the three Hellcats (numbered 1–3), specially modified to reduce weight and painted sea blue with gold leaf trim, through their inaugural 15-minute-long performance. The team employed a North American SNJ Texan, painted and configured to simulate a Japanese Zero, to simulate aerial combat. This aircraft was later painted yellow and dubbed the "Beetle Bomb". This aircraft is said to have been inspired by one of the Spike Jones' Murdering the Classics series of musical satires, set to the tune (in part) of the William Tell Overture as a thoroughbred horse race scene, with "Beetle Bomb" being the "trailing horse" in the lyrics.

The team thrilled spectators with low-flying maneuvers performed in tight formations, and (according to Voris) by "keeping something in front of the crowds at all times. My objective was to beat the Army Air Corps. If we did that, we'd get all the other side issues. I felt that if we weren't the best, it would be my naval career." The Blue Angels' first public demonstration also netted the team its first trophy, which sits on display at the team's current home at NAS Pensacola. During an air show at Omaha, Nebraska on 19–21 July 1946, the Navy Flight Exhibition Team was introduced as the Blue Angels. The name had originated through a suggestion by Right Wing Pilot Lt. Maurice "Wick" Wickendoll, after he had read about the Blue Angel nightclub in The New Yorker magazine. After ten appearances with the Hellcats, the Hellcats were replaced by the lighter, faster, and more powerful F8F-1 Bearcats on 25 August. By the end of the year the team consisted of four Bearcats numbered 1–4 on the tail sections.

In May 1947, flight leader Lt. Cmdr. Bob Clarke replaced Butch Voris as the leader of the team. The team with an additional fifth pilot, relocated to Naval Air Station (NAS) Corpus Christi, Texas. On 7 June at Birmingham, Alabama, four F8F-1 Bearcats (numbered 1–4) flew in diamond formation for the first time which is now considered the Blue Angels' trademark. A fifth Bearcat was also added that year. A SNJ was used as a Japanese Zero for dogfights with the Bearcats in air shows.

In January 1948, Lt. Cmdr. Raleigh " Dusty" Rhodes took command of the Blue Angels team which was flying four Bearcats and a yellow painted SNJ with USN markings dubbed "Beetle Bomb"; the SNJ represented a Japanese Zero for the air show dogfights with the Bearcats. The name "Blue Angels" also was painted on the Bearcats.

In 1949, the team acquired a Douglas R4D Skytrain for logistics to and from show sites. The team's SNJ was also replaced by another Bearcat, painted yellow for the air combat routine, inheriting the "Beetle Bomb" nickname. In May, the team went to the west coast on temporary duty so the pilots and the rest of the team could become familiar with jet aircraft. On 13 July, the team acquired, and began flying the straight-wing Grumman F9F-2B Panther between demonstration shows. On 20 August, the team debuted the panther jets under Team Leader Lt. Commander Raleigh "Dusty" Rhodes during an air show at Beaumont, Texas and added a sixth pilot. The F8F-1 "Beetle Bomb" was relegated to solo aerobatics before the main show, until it crashed on takeoff at a training show in Pensacola on 24 April 1950, killing "Blues" pilot Lt. Robert Longworth. Team headquarters shifted from NAS Corpus Christi, Texas, to NAAS Whiting Field, Florida, on 10 September 1949, announced 14 July 1949.

1950–1959

The Blue Angels pilots continued to perform nationwide in 1950. On 25 June, the Korean War started, and all Blue Angels pilots volunteered for combat duty. The squadron (due to a shortage of pilots, and no available planes) and its members were ordered to "combat-ready status" after an exhibition at Naval Air Station, Dallas, Texas on 30 July. The Blue Angels were disbanded, and its pilots were reassigned to a carrier. Once aboard the aircraft carrier  on 9 November, the group formed the core of Fighter Squadron 191 (VF-19), "Satan's Kittens", under the command of World War II fighter ace and 1950 Blue Angels Commander/Flight Leader, Lt. Commander John Magda; he was killed in action on 8 March 1951.

On 25 October 1951, the Blues were ordered to re-activate as a flight demonstration team, and reported to NAS Corpus Christi, Texas. Lt. Cdr. Voris was again tasked with assembling the team (he was the first of only two commanding officers to lead them twice). In May 1952, the Blue Angels began performing again with F9F-5 Panthers at an airshow in Memphis, Tennessee. In 1953, the team traded its Sky Train for a Curtiss R5C Commando. In August, "Blues" leader LCDR Ray Hawkins became the first naval aviator to survive an ejection at supersonic speeds when a new F9F-6 he was piloting became uncontrollable on a cross-country flight. After summer, the team began demonstrating with F9F-6 Cougar.

In 1954, the first Marine Corps pilot, Captain Chuck Hiett, joined the Navy flight demonstration team. The Blue Angels also received special colored flight suits. In May, the Blue Angels performed at Bolling Air Force Base in Washington, D.C. with the Air Force Thunderbirds (activated 25 May 1953). The Blue Angels began relocating to their current home at Naval Air Station (NAS) Pensacola, Florida that winter, and it was here they progressed to the swept-wing Grumman F9F-8 Cougar. In December, the team left its home base for its first winter training facility at Naval Air Facility El Centro, California

In September 1956, the team added a sixth aircraft to the flight demonstration in the Opposing Solo position, and gave its first performance outside the United States at the International Air Exposition in Toronto, Ontario, Canada. It also upgraded its logistics aircraft to the Douglas R5D Skymaster.

In 1957, the Blue Angels transitioned from the F9F-8 Cougar to the supersonic Grumman F11F-1 Tiger. The first demonstration was flying the short-nosed version on 23 March, at Barin Field, Pensacola, and then the long-nosed versions. The demonstration team (with added Angel 6) wore gold flight suits during the first air show that season.

In 1958, the first Six-Plane Delta Maneuvers were added that season.

1960–1969

In July 1964, the Blue Angels participated in the Aeronaves de Mexico Anniversary Air Show over Mexico City, Mexico, before an estimated crowd of 1.5 million people.

In 1965, the Blue Angels conducted a Caribbean island tour, flying at five sites. Later that year, they embarked on a European tour to a dozen sites, including the Paris Air Show, where they were the only team to receive a standing ovation.

In 1967, the Blues toured Europe again, at six sites.

In 1968, the C-54 Skymaster transport aircraft was replaced with a Lockheed VC-121J Constellation. The Blues transitioned to the two-seat McDonnell Douglas F-4J Phantom II in 1969, nearly always keeping the back seat empty for flight demonstrations. The Phantom was the only plane to be flown by both the "Blues" and the United States Air Force Thunderbirds (the "Birds"). That year they also upgraded to the Lockheed C-121 Super Constellation for logistics.

1970–1979

In 1970, the Blues received their first U.S. Marine Corps Lockheed KC-130F Hercules, manned by an all-Marine crew. That year, they went on their first South American tour.

In 1971, the team which wore the gold flight suits for the first show, conducted its first Far East Tour, performing at a dozen locations in Korea, Japan, Taiwan, Guam, and the Philippines.

In 1972, the Blue Angels were awarded the Navy's Meritorious Unit Commendation for the two-year period from 1 March 1970 to 31 December 1971. Another European tour followed in 1973, including air shows in Iran, England, France, Spain, Turkey, Greece, and Italy.

On 10 December 1973, the Navy Flight Exhibition Team was reorganized and commissioned the United States Navy Flight Demonstration Squadron. The Blues mission was more on Navy recruiting.

In 1974, the Blue Angels transitioned to the new Douglas A-4F Skyhawk II. Navy Commander Anthony Less became the squadron's first "commanding officer" and "flight leader". A permanent flight surgeon position and administration officer was added to the team. The squadron's mission was redefined by Less to further improve the recruiting effort.

Beginning in 1975, "Bert" was used for Jet Assisted Take Off (JATO) and short aerial demonstrations just prior to the main event at selected venues, but the JATO demonstration ended in 2009 due to dwindling supplies of rockets. "Fat Albert Airlines" flies with an all-Marine crew of three officers and five enlisted personnel.

1980–1989
In 1986, LCDR Donnie Cochran, joined the Blue Angels as the first African-American Naval Aviator to be selected. He served for two more years with the squadron flying the left wing-man position in the No.3 A-4F fighter, and returned to command the Blue Angels in 1995 and 1996.

On 8 November 1986, the Blue Angels completed their 40th anniversary year during ceremonies unveiling what would be their aircraft through their 75th anniversary year, the McDonnell Douglas F/A-18 Hornet. The power and aerodynamics of the Hornet allows them to perform a slow, high angle of attack "tail sitting" maneuver, and to fly a "dirty" (landing gear down) formation loop.

1990–1999

In 1992, the Blue Angels deployed for a month-long European tour, their first in 19 years, conducting shows in Sweden, Finland, Russia (first foreign flight demonstration team to perform there), Romania, Bulgaria, Italy, the United Kingdom, and Spain.

In 1998, CDR Patrick Driscoll made the first "Blue Jet" landing on a "haze gray and underway" aircraft carrier, USS Harry S. Truman (CVN-75).

On 8 October 1999, the Blue Angels lost two pilots. LCDR Kieron O'Connor and LT Kevin Colling were returning from a practice flight before an air show when their F/A-18B crashed in a wooded area of south Georgia.

2000–2009
In 2000, the Navy was conducting investigations in regard and connected to the loss of two Blue Angels pilots in October 1999. The pilots of the F/A-18 Hornet were not required to wear and do not wear g-suits.

In 2006, the Blue Angels marked their 60th year of performing. On 30 October 2008, a spokesman for the team announced that the team would complete its last three performances of the year with five jets instead of six. The change was because one pilot and another officer in the organization had been removed from duty for engaging in an "inappropriate relationship". The Navy said one of the individuals was a man and the other a woman, one a Marine and the other from the Navy, and that Rear Admiral Mark Guadagnini, chief of Naval air training, was reviewing the situation. At the next performance at Lackland Air Force Base following the announcement the No.4 or slot pilot, was absent from the formation. A spokesman for the team would not confirm the identity of the pilot removed from the team. On 6 November 2008, both officers were found guilty at an admiral's mast on unspecified charges but the resulting punishment was not disclosed. The names of the two members involved were later released on the Pensacola News Journal website/forum as pilot No.4 USMC Maj. Clint Harris and the administrative officer, Navy Lt. Gretchen Doane.

On 21 April 2007, pilot Kevin "Kojak" Davis was killed and eight people on the ground were injured when Davis lost control of the No.6 jet and crashed due to G-force-induced Loss Of Consciousness (G-LOC) during an air show at the Marine Corps Air Station Beaufort in Beaufort, South Carolina.

The Fat Albert performed its final JATO demonstration at the 2009 Pensacola Homecoming show, expending their eight remaining JATO bottles. This demonstration not only was the last JATO performance of the squadron, but also the final JATO use of the U.S. Marine Corps.

In 2009, the Blue Angels were inducted into the International Air & Space Hall of Fame at the San Diego Air & Space Museum.

2010–2019

On 22 May 2011, the Blue Angels were performing at the Lynchburg Regional Airshow in Lynchburg, Virginia, when the Diamond formation flew the Barrel Roll Break maneuver at an altitude lower than the required minimum. The maneuver was aborted, the remainder of the demonstration canceled and all aircraft landed safely. The next day, the Blue Angels announced that they were initiating a safety stand-down, canceling their upcoming Naval Academy Airshow and returning to their home base in Pensacola, Florida, for additional training and airshow practice. On 26 May, the Blue Angels announced they would not be flying their traditional fly-over of the Naval Academy Graduation Ceremony and that they were canceling their 28–29 May 2011 performances at the Millville Wings and Wheels Airshow in Millville, New Jersey.

On 27 May 2011, the Blue Angels announced that Commander Dave Koss, the squadron's commanding officer, would be stepping down. He was replaced by Captain Greg McWherter, the team's previous commanding officer. The squadron canceled performances at the Rockford, Illinois Airfest 4–5 June and the Evansville, Indiana Freedom Festival Air Show 11–12 June to allow additional practice and demonstration training under McWherter's leadership.

On 29 July 2011, a new Blue Angels Mustang GT was auctioned off for $400,000 at the Experimental Aircraft Association AirVenture Oshkosh (Oshkosh Air Show) annual summer gathering of aviation enthusiasts from 25 to 31 July in Oshkosh, Wisconsin which had an attendance of 541,000 persons and 2,522 show planes.

Between 2 and 4 September 2011 on Labor Day weekend, the Blue Angels flew for the first time with a fifty-fifty blend of conventional JP-5 jet fuel and a camelina-based biofuel at Naval Air Station Patuxent River, Maryland. McWherter flew an F/A-18 test flight on 17 August and stated there were no noticeable differences in performance from inside the cockpit.

On 1 March 2013, the U.S. Navy announced that it was cancelling remaining 2013 performances after 1 April 2013 due to sequestration budget constraints. In October 2013, Secretary of Defense Chuck Hagel, stating that "community and public outreach is a crucial Departmental activity", announced that the Blue Angels (along with the U.S. Air Force's Thunderbirds) would resume appearing at air shows starting in 2014, although the number of flyovers will continue to be severely reduced.

On 15 March 2014, the demonstration pilots numbered 1–7 wore gold flight suits to celebrate the team's "return to the skies" during their first air show of the season; there were only three air shows in 2013.

In July 2014, Marine Corps C-130 pilot Capt. Katie Higgins, 27, became the first female pilot to join the Blue Angels, flying the support aircraft Fat Albert for the 2015 and 2016 show seasons.

In July 2015, Cmdr Bob Flynn became the Blue Angels' first executive officer.

On 2 June 2016, Capt. Jeff Kuss Opposing Solo died just after takeoff while performing the Split-S maneuver in his Hornet during a practice run for The Great Tennessee Air Show in Smyrna, Tennessee. The Navy's investigation found that Capt. Kuss had performed the maneuver too low while failing to retard the throttle out of afterburner, causing him to fall too fast and recover too low above the ground. Capt. Kuss ejected, but his parachute was immediately engulfed in flames, causing him to fall to his death. Kuss' body was recovered just yards away from the crash site. The cause of death was blunt force trauma to the head. The investigation also cited weather and pilot fatigue as additional causes of the crash. In a strange twist, Captain Kuss' fatal crash happened hours after the Blue Angels' fellow pilots in the United States Air Force Thunderbirds suffered a crash of their own, following the United States Air Force Academy graduation ceremony earlier that day. Capt. Jeff Kuss was replaced by Cmdr. Frank Weisser to finish out the 2016 and 2017 seasons.

In July 2016, Boeing was awarded a $12 million contract to begin an engineering proposal for converting the Boeing F/A-18E/F Super Hornet for Blue Angels use, with the proposal to be completed by September 2017.

The Fat Albert (BUNO 164763) was retired from service in May 2019 with 30,000 flight hours. The Blue Angels replaced it with an Ex-RAF C-130J (BUNO 170000).

2020–present 

In response to the Coronavirus outbreak, the Blue Angels flew over multiple US cities as a tribute to healthcare and front line workers.

The Blues officially transitioned to Boeing F/A-18E/F Super Hornets on 4 November 2020.

In July 2022, Lt. Amanda Lee was announced as the first woman to serve as a demonstration pilot in the Blue Angels.

Aircraft timeline

The "Blues" have flown ten different demonstration aircraft and six support aircraft models:

Demonstration aircraft
Grumman F6F-5 Hellcat: June – August 1946
Grumman F8F-1 Bearcat: August 1946 – 1949
Grumman F9F-2 Panther: 1949 – June 1950 (first jet); F9F-5 Panther: 1951 – Winter 1954/55
Grumman F9F-8 Cougar: Winter 1954/55 – mid-season 1957 (swept-wing)
Grumman F11F-1 (F-11) Tiger: mid-season 1957 – 1968 (first supersonic jet)
McDonnell Douglas F-4J Phantom II: 1969 – December 1974
Douglas A-4F Skyhawk: December 1974 – November 1986
McDonnell Douglas F/A-18 Hornet (F/A-18B as #7): November 1986 – 2010
Boeing F/A-18A/C (B/D as #7) Hornet: 2010-2020
Boeing F/A-18E Super Hornet (F/A-18F as #7): 2020–

Support aircraft
JRB Expeditor (Beech 18): 1949–?
Douglas R4D-6 Skytrain: 1949–1955
Curtiss R5C Commando: 1953
Douglas R5D Skymaster: 1956–1968
Lockheed C-121 Super Constellation: 1969–1973
Lockheed C-130 Hercules "Fat Albert": 1970–2019 (JATO usage was stopped in 2009)
Lockheed Martin C-130J Super Hercules "Fat Albert": 2020–present

Miscellaneous aircraft
North American SNJ Texan "Beetle Bomb" (used to simulate a Japanese A6M Zero aircraft in demonstrations during the late 1940s)
Lockheed T-33 Shooting Star (Used during the 1950s as a VIP transport aircraft for the team)
Vought F7U Cutlass (two of the unusual F7Us were received in late 1952 and flown as a side demonstration during the 1953 season but they were not a part of their regular formations which at the time used the F9F Panther. Pilots and ground crew found it unsatisfactory and a plan to use it as the team's primary aircraft was canceled).

Air show routine

The 2022 Blue Angels High Show Routine:
 Fat Albert (C-130)high-performance takeoff (Low Transition)
 Fat AlbertParade Pass (The plane banks around the front of the crowd.)
 Fat AlbertFlat Pass
 Fat AlbertHead on Pass
 Fat AlbertShort-Field Assault Landing
 FA-18 Engine Start-Up and Taxi Out
 Diamond Takeoffeither a low transition with turn, a loop on takeoff, a Half Cuban Eight takeoff, or a Half Squirrel Cage
 Solos Take OffNo. 5 Dirty Roll on Takeoff; No. 6 Low transition/Immelman
 Diamond 360Aircraft 1-4 in their signature 18-inch wingtip-to-canopy diamond formation
 Opposing Knife Edge Pass  5 and 6
 Diamond Rollentire diamond formation rolls as a single entity
 Opposing Inverted to Inverted Rolls 5 and 6
 Diamond Aileron Rollall four diamond jets perform simultaneous aileron rolls
 FortusSolos flying in carrier landing configuration with No.5 inverted, establishing a "mirror image" effect
 Diamond Dirty Loopthe diamond flies a loop with all four jets in carrier landing configuration
 Minimum Radius Turnhighest G maneuver (No. 5 flies a "horizontal loop" pulling seven Gs to maintain a tight radius.)
 Double Farveldiamond formation flat pass with No.1 and No.4 inverted
 Opposing Minimum Radius Turn
 Echelon Parade
 Opposing Horizontal Rolls
 Changeover Rolla left Echelon barrel roll where the echelon formation changes over to diamond formation after 90° off bank. 
 Sneak Passthe fastest speed of the show, just under Mach 1 (about 700 mph at sea level)
 Line-Abreast Loopthe most difficult formation maneuver to do well (No.5 joins the diamond as the five jets fly a loop in a straight line.)
 Opposing Four Point Hesitation Roll
 Vertical Break
 Opposing Vertical Pitch
 Barrel Roll Break
 Tuck Over Roll
 Low Break Cross
 Section High-Alpha Pass: (tail sitting), the show's slowest maneuver
 Diamond Burner 270
 Delta Roll
 Fleur de Lis
 Solos Pass to Rejoin, Diamond flies a loop
 Loop Break CrossDelta Break (After the break the aircraft separate in six different directions, perform half Cuban Eights then cross in the center of the performance area.)
 Delta Breakout
 Delta Pitch Up Carrier Break to Land

Commanding officers
Notable Commanding Officers include;
Roy Marlin Voris – 1946, 1952
John J. Magda – 1950, Killed in Action March 1951, Korean War
Arthur Ray Hawkins – 1952 to 1953
Richard Cormier – 1954 to 1956
Edward B. Holley – 1957 to 1958
Zebulon V. Knott – 1959 to 1961
Kenneth R. Wallace – 1962 to 1963
Robert F. Aumack – 1964 to 1966
William V. Wheat – 1967 to 1969
Harley H. Hall – 1970 to 1971
 Don Bently – 1972
 Marvin F. "Skip" Umstead – 1973
 Anthony A. Less – Oct 1973 to Jan 1976
 Keith S. Jones – 1976 to 1978
William E. Newman – 1978 to 1979
 Hugh D. Wisely – Dec 1979 to 1982
 David Carroll – 1982 to 1983
 Larry Pearson – 1983 to 1985
 Gilman E. Rud – Nov 1985 to Nov 1988
 Gregory Wooldridge – 1990 to 1992, 1996
 Robert E. Stumpf – 1993 to 1994
 Donnie Cochran – Nov 1994 to May 1996
 George B. Dom – Nov 1996 to Oct 1998
 Patrick Driscoll – Oct 1998 to 2000

 Robert Field – 2000 to Sept 2002
 Russell J. Bartlett – Sept 2002 to Sept 2004
 Stephen R. Foley – Sept 2004 to Nov 2006
 Kevin Mannix – Nov 2006 to 2008
 Gregory McWherter 2008 to 2010, 2011
 David Koss – Fall 2010 to spring of 2011
Gregory McWherter – 2011 to 2012
 Thomas Frosch – 2012 to 2015
 Ryan Bernacchi – 2015 to 2017
 Eric D. Doyle – 2017 to 2019
Brian C. Kesselring – 2019 to 2022
Alexander P. Armatas – 2022 to present

Notable members
Below are some of the more notable members of the Blue Angels squadron:

 Capt Roy "Butch" Voris, World War II fighter ace and first Flight Leader
Charles "Chuck" Brady Jr., Astronaut and physician
 Donnie Cochran, First African-American Blue Angels aviator and commander
 Edward L. Feightner, World War II fighter ace and Lead Solo
 Arthur Ray Hawkins, World War II flying ace
 Bob Hoover, World War II fighter pilot and flight instructor, honorary Blue Angel member
 Anthony A. Less, First Commanding Officer of Blue Angels squadron, numerous other commands including Naval Air Forces Atlantic Fleet
 Robert L. Rasmussen, Aviation Artist
 Raleigh Rhodes, World War II and Korean War fighter pilot and third Flight Leader of the Blue Angels
 Patrick M. Walsh, Left Wingman and Slot Pilot who later commanded the U.S. Pacific Fleet and became Vice Chief of Naval Operations and a White House Fellow

Team accidents, deaths
A total of 26 Blue Angels pilots and one crew member have died in Blue Angels history.

Deaths
1946–present (20 pilots, one crew member)
 Lt. Ross "Robby" Robinson29 September 1946: killed during a performance when a wingtip broke off his F8F-1 Bearcat, sending him into an unrecoverable spin.
 Lt. Bud Wood7 July 1952: killed when his F9F-5 Panther collided with another Panther jet during a demonstration in Corpus Christi, Texas. The team resumed performances two weeks later.
 Cmdr. Robert Nicholls Glasgow14 October 1958: died during an orientation flight just days after reporting for duty as the new Blue Angels leader.
 Lt. Anton M. Campanella (#3 Left Wing)14 June 1960: killed flying a Grumman F-11A Tiger that crashed into the water near Fort Morgan, Alabama during a test flight.
 Lt. George L. Neale15 March 1964: killed during an attempted emergency landing at Apalach Airport near Apalachicola, Florida. Lt. Neale's F-11A Tiger had experienced mechanical difficulties during a flight from West Palm Beach, to Naval Air Station Pensacola, causing him to attempt the emergency landing. Failing to reach the airport, he ejected from the aircraft on final approach, but his parachute did not have sufficient time to fully deploy.
 Lt. Cmdr. Dick Oliver2 September 1966: crashed his F-11A Tiger and was killed at the Canadian International Air Show in Toronto.
 Lt Frank Gallagher1 February 1967: killed when his F-11A Tiger stalled during a practice Half Cuban Eight maneuver and spun into the ground.
 Capt. Ronald Thompson18 February 1967: killed when his F-11A Tiger struck the ground during a practice formation loop.
 Lt. Bill Worley (Opposing Solo)14 January 1968: killed when his Tiger crashed during a practice double Immelmann.
 Lt. Larry Watters14 February 1972: killed when his F-4J Phantom II struck the ground, upright, while practicing inverted flight, during winter training at NAF El Centro.
 Lt. Cmdr. Skip Umstead (Team Leader), Capt. Mike Murphy, and ADJ1 Ron Thomas (Crew Chief)26 July 1973: all three were killed in a mid-air collision between two Phantoms over Lakehurst, New Jersey, during an arrival practice. The rest of the season was cancelled after this incident.
 Lt. Nile Kraft (Opposing Solo)22 February 1977: killed when his Skyhawk struck the ground during practice.
 Lt. Michael Curtin8 November 1978: one of the solo Skyhawks struck the ground after low roll during arrival maneuvers at Naval Air Station Miramar, and Curtin was killed.
 Lt. Cmdr Stu Powrie (Lead Solo)22 February 1982: killed when his Skyhawk struck the ground during winter training at Naval Air Facility El Centro, California, just after a dirty loop.
 Lt. Cmdr. Mike Gershon (Opposing Solo #6)13 July 1985: his Skyhawk collided with Lt. Andy Caputi (Lead Solo #5) during a show at Niagara Falls, Gershon was killed and Caputi ejected and parachuted to safety.
 Lt. Cmdr. Kieron O'Connor and Lt. Kevin Colling28 October 1999: flying in the back seat and front seat of a Hornet, both were killed after striking the ground during circle and arrival maneuvers in Valdosta, Georgia.
 Lt. Cmdr. Kevin J. Davis21 April 2007: crashed his Hornet near the end of the Marine Corps Air Station Beaufort airshow in Beaufort, South Carolina, and was killed.
 Capt. Jeff Kuss (Opposing Solo, #6)2 June 2016: died just after takeoff while performing the Split-S maneuver in his F/A-18 Hornet during a practice run for The Great Tennessee Air Show in Smyrna, Tennessee.

Other incidents
1958–2010
 Lt. John R. Dewenter2 August 1958: landed wheels up at Buffalo Niagara International Airport after experiencing engine troubles during a show in Clarence, New York. The Grumman F-11 Tiger landed on Runway 23, but exited airport property, coming to rest in the intersection of Genesee Street and Dick Road, nearly hitting a filling station. Lt. Dewenter was uninjured, but the plane was a total loss.
 Lt. Ernie Christensen30 August 1970: belly-landed his F-4J Phantom at The Eastern Iowa Airport in Cedar Rapids, Iowa, after he inadvertently left the landing gear in the up position. He ejected safely, while the aircraft slid off the runway.
 Cmdr. Harley Hall4 June 1971: safely ejected after his F-4J Phantom jet caught fire during practice over NAS Quonset Point in North Kingstown, Rhode Island, and crashed in Narragansett Bay.
 Capt. John Fogg, Lt. Marlin Wiita, and Lt. Cmdr. Don Bentley8 March 1973: all three survived a multi-aircraft mid-air collision during practice over Superstition Mountain, near El Centro, California.
 Lt. Jim Ross (Lead Solo)April 1980: unhurt when his Skyhawk suffered a fuel line fire during a show at Roosevelt Roads Naval Station, Puerto Rico. Lt. Ross stayed with the plane and landed, leaving the end of the runway and rolling into the woods after a total hydraulic failure upon landing.
 Lt. Dave Anderson (Lead solo)12 February 1987: ejected from his Hornet after a dual engine flame-out during practice near El Centro, California.
 Marine Corps Maj. Charles Moseley and Cmdr. Pat Moneymaker23 January 1990: their Blue Angel Hornets suffered a mid-air collision during a practice at El Centro. Moseley ejected safely and Moneymaker was able to land his airplane, which then required a complete right wing replacement.
 Lt. Ted Steelman1 December 2004: ejected from his F/A-18 approximately one mile off Perdido Key after his aircraft struck the water, suffering catastrophic engine and structural damage. He suffered minor injuries.

Combat casualties
Four former Blue Angels pilots have been killed in action or died after being captured, all having been downed by anti-aircraft fire.

Korean War
 Commander John Magda – 8 March 1951: Blue Angels (1949, 1950; Commander/Flight Leader 1950): Magda was killed after his F9F-2B Panther was hit by anti aircraft fire while leading a low-level strike mission against North Korean and Chinese communist positions at Tanchon which earned him the Navy Cross during the Korean War. He also was a fighter ace in World War II.

Vietnam War
 Commander Herbert P. Hunter – 19 July 1967: Blue Angels (1957–1959; Lead Solo pilot): Hunter was hit by antiaircraft fire in North Vietnam and crashed in his F-8E Crusader during the Vietnam war. He was awarded the Distinguished Flying Cross posthumously for actions on 16 July 1967. He also was a Korean War veteran.
 Captain Clarence O. Tolbert – 6 November 1972: Blue Angels (1968): Tolbert was flying a Corsair II (A-7B) during a mission in North Vietnam and was hit by antiaircraft fire, crashed, and died during his second tour in the Vietnam war. He was awarded the Silver Star and Distinguished Flying Cross for his service.
 Captain Harley H. Hall – 27 January 1973: Blue Angels (1970–1971; Commander/Team Leader 1971): Hall and his co-pilot were shot down by antiaircraft fire in South Vietnam flying their F-4J Phantom II on the last day of the Vietnam War, and they both were officially listed as prisoners of war. In 1980, Hall was presumed to have died while captured.

In the media

 The Blue Angels was a dramatic television series, starring Dennis Cross and Don Gordon, inspired by the team's exploits and filmed with the cooperation of the Navy. It aired in syndication from 26 September 1960 to 3 July 1961.
 Threshold: The Blue Angels Experience is a 1975 documentary film, written by Dune author Frank Herbert, featuring the team in practice and performance during their F-4J Phantom era; many of the aerial photography techniques pioneered in Threshold were later used in the film Top Gun.
 To Fly!, a short IMAX film featured at the Smithsonian Air and Space Museum since its 1976 opening features footage from a camera on a Blue Angels A4 Skyhawk tail as the pilot performs in a show.
 In 2005, the Discovery Channel aired a documentary miniseries, Blue Angels: A Year in the Life, focusing on the intricate day-to-day details of that year's training and performance schedule.
 In 2009, MythBusters enlisted the aid of Blue Angels to help test the myth that a sonic boom could shatter glass.
 Blue Angels and the Thunderbirds is a four-disc SkyTrax DVD set 2012 TOPICS Entertainment, Inc. It features highlights from airshows performed in the United States shot from inside and outside the cockpit including interviews of squadron aviators, plus aerial combat footage taken during Desert Storm, histories of the two flying squadrons from 1947 through 2008 including on-screen notes on changes in Congressional budgeting and research program funding, photo gallery slideshow, and two "forward-looking" sequences Into the 21st Century detailing developments of the F/A-18 Hornet's C and E and F models (10 min.) and footage of the F-22 with commentary (20 min.).

See also
 List of United States Navy aircraft squadrons
 United States Air Force Thunderbirds
 United States Marine Corps Aviation

References

Further reading
 (2012). "My incredible flight aboard the Blue Angels" By Charles Atkeison 
 Blue Angels Timeline (1946–1980) accessed 10 November 2005.
 "Grumman and the Blue Angels" article by William C. Barto at the Grumman Memorial Park official website, accessed 15 October 2005.
 "First Blue: The story of World War II Ace Butch Voris and the Creation of the Blue Angels" by Robert K. Wilcox, Thomas Dunne Books/St.Martins Press, 2004, robertkwilcox.com

External links

 Blue Angels, official U.S. Navy web site
 Complete Blue Angels History
 The Navy’s Blue Angels (1966), Texas Archive of the Moving Image
 Blue Angels Sneak Pass video on Youtube.com

Aircraft squadrons of the United States Navy
American aerobatic teams
Ceremonial units of the United States military